The 1983 Copa Fraternidad was the 13th edition of the Central American football club championship organized by UNCAF, the regional governing body of Central America.

Comunicaciones F.C. won their second title by winning the final round.

Teams
Only Costa Rica, El Salvador and Guatemala sent representatives.

Group I

Group II

Group III
Águila won group

Final Round
Also known as Triangular

References

1983
1
1982–83 in Costa Rican football
1982–83 in Salvadoran football
1982–83 in Guatemalan football